Alappuzha railway station (also known as Alleppey railway station, code: ALLP) is located at Alappuzha, Kerala, India. The station is a major station on the Ernakulam–Kayamkulam coastal line. It is an NSG 3 category station. The station is operated by the Southern Railway zone of the Indian Railways and comes under the Thiruvananthapuram railway division.

History

The Ernakulam South–Alappuzha coastal railway line was opened on 16 October 1989. The railway line was later extended to Kayamkulam in 1992.

Layout
Alappuzha railway station has 3 platforms to handle long distance and passenger trains. Escalators inaugurated at PF#1 of Alappuzha Railway station

Significance
Alappuzha is an important tourist destination in Kerala. The backwaters of Alappuzha are one among the most popular tourist attractions in Kerala. Alappuzha is also the access point for the annual Nehru Trophy Boat Race. Alappuzha railway station thus acts as a gateway for visiting the tourist attractions in and around Alappuzha.

Important trains originating from Alappuzha

The following trains starting from Alappuzha station:

Facilities 
An integrated security system was installed at the station in 2012 featuring baggage scanners, CCTVs and vehicle scanners.

 Reservation counters are open between 6:00 am to 8:00 pm
 Retirement rooms (transit lodging facility)
 Parcel booking office
 Railway Mailing service (RMS) office
 Railway Protection Force - Circle office
 IRCTC restaurant
 ATMs
 Pre-paid autorickshaw counters
 Pre-paid parking space
 Escalator and elevator systems

ATMs 
The following bank-ATMs are available at the railway station:

 State Bank of India
 Punjab National Bank

See also 

 Ernakulam–Kayamkulam coastal line
 Thiruvananthapuram railway division
 Ernakulam Junction railway station

Sources
https://indiarailinfo.com/departures/alappuzha-alleppey-allp/54
https://www.trainspnrstatus.com/station/alappuzha

References

Thiruvananthapuram railway division
Railway stations in Alappuzha district
1989 establishments in Kerala
Railway stations opened in 1989
Transport in Alappuzha
Buildings and structures in Alappuzha